William Kwabena Tiero (born 3 December 1980) is a former Ghanaian football player who played as a midfielder.

International
Tiero was part of the Ghanaian 2004 Olympic football team, which exited in the first round, having finished in third place in group B. Played all the three games against Italy, Paraguay and Japan, scored one goal.

External links

Living people
1980 births
Association football midfielders
Ghanaian footballers
Ghana international footballers
Ghanaian expatriate footballers
Olympic footballers of Ghana
Footballers at the 2004 Summer Olympics
People from Tema
Expatriate footballers in Portugal
Ghanaian expatriate sportspeople in Portugal
Expatriate footballers in Bulgaria
Ghanaian expatriate sportspeople in Bulgaria
Expatriate footballers in Saudi Arabia
Liberty Professionals F.C. players
Asante Kotoko S.C. players
Vitória S.C. players
S.C. Olhanense players
Associação Naval 1º de Maio players
Associação Académica de Coimbra – O.A.F. players
Gil Vicente F.C. players
PFC CSKA Sofia players
Primeira Liga players
First Professional Football League (Bulgaria) players
Al-Qadsiah FC players
Saudi Professional League players